= Francesco Borrelli =

Italian engineer

Francesco Borrelli from the University of California, Berkeley, CA was named Fellow of the Institute of Electrical and Electronics Engineers (IEEE) in 2016 for contributions to the theory and application of model predictive control.
